Hellabrunn Zoo is a 40 hectare (99 acre) zoological garden in the Bavarian capital of Munich. The zoo is situated on the right bank of the river Isar, in the southern part of Munich near the quarter of Thalkirchen.

A high ratio of enclosures are cageless, relying upon moat features to keep the animals in place.
The zoo was the first zoo in the world not organized by species, but also by geographical aspects. For example, the wood bison share their enclosure with prairie dogs.

In 2013, the zoo was ranked the fourth best zoo in Europe (up from 12th). It focuses on conservation and captive breeding rare species such as the rare drill and silvery gibbons. Also gorillas, giraffes, elephants, wood bisons, elk and Arctic foxes were successfully bred in the zoo, which houses many species. It is one of the very few zoos that allows visitors to bring dogs.

Tierpark Hellabrunn is a member of the European Association of Zoos and Aquaria (EAZA) and the World Association of Zoos and Aquariums (WAZA) and participates in the European Endangered Species Programme (EEP).

History

The zoo was designed by architect Emanuel von Seidl, and opened to the public on 1 August 1911.

In 1922, the zoo was closed due to the inflation in Germany. It was re-opened on May 23, 1928. It became the first Geo-Zoo in the world (animals were shown and kept with other animals of the same geographic region). It also engaged in controversial back-breeding to "recreate" extinct animals like Heck cattle (to mimic the Aurochs) and the Tarpan.

During World War II, the zoo sustained extensive damage due to Allied air raids, but it was able to reopen in May 1945.

In 1970, a badly needed plan for the renovation of the zoo was drawn up.

Hellabrunn today
In 2014 it was home to 18,943 animals representing 767 species.

The Tierpark Hellabrunn is very active in breeding, reintroduction and conservation projects.

Over 2.2 million people visited Hellabrunn in 2014.

As the groundwater level here is rather high and the water is of very good quality, the zoo can cover its needs for freshwater by using its own wells.

Attractions

The elephant house: Constructed in 1914, renovated 2011-2016
The new jungle house which houses gorillas, chimpanzees, Diana monkeys and American alligators
Rare but very acrobatic silvery gibbons, spider monkeys and rare drills
The new savannah house where visitors are separated only by a glass wall from the giraffes
The aquarium with the piranha feeding
"Dracula's villa" - bats fly around visitors
Many other buildings like the "Polarium"
 Guided tours - especially when it's dark and there is no one else in the zoo
 Children's birthday parties

Notes

External links

 
Hellabrunn Zoo on zooinstitutes.com

Zoos in Germany
Tourist attractions in Munich
Buildings and structures in Munich